Benjamin David de Jesus, OMI (25 July 1940 – 4 February 1997) was a Philippine prelate of the Catholic Church who served as the Apostolic Vicar of Jolo from 1992 until his murder in 1997. He was the first Filipino bishop to be assassinated in the history of the Catholic Bishops' Conference of the Philippines.

Biography
Benjamin David de Jesus was born in the Hulong Duhat district of Malabon, Rizal (now part of Metro Manila) on 25 July 1940. He was ordained a priest as a member of the Oblates of Mary Immaculate on 29 December 1967. 

On 11 October 1991, Pope John Paul II named him titular bishop of Bladia and Apostolic Vicar of Jolo. He received his episcopal consecration on 6 January 1992 from Pope John Paul. He was installed in Jolo on 15 February.

He was shot six times and killed outside the cathedral on Jolo on 4 February 1997. A female bystander was killed and several others were wounded. Authorities blamed Abu Sayyaf, a Muslim group intent on disrupting interreligious rapprochement. The crime remains unsolved.

De Jesus was entombed in the Jolo Cathedral. His assassination is commemorated annually, usually with demonstrations of Christian-Muslim solidarity. The Ben de Jesus College Library at Notre Dame of Midsayap College is named after him.

References

External links
Catholic Hierarchy: Bishop Benjamin David de Jesus, O.M.I.  

1940 births
1997 deaths
People from Malabon
Assassinated people
People murdered in the Philippines
Unsolved murders in the Philippines
1997 murders in the Philippines
Missionary Oblates of Mary Immaculate